"Mydriase" is an essay written  by French Nobel laureate J. M. G. Le Clézio.

Subject
Mydriasis is the dilation of the pupils in a state of hallucinatory enlightenment (possibly induced by certain drugs). There is an Indian song that is so powerful that it is regularly accompanied by alcohol and drugs to help the singer to reach his inner voice and to open the cosmic forces. Author questions this as a  valid use of recreational drugs. The author's experiences of drugs are described in "Mydriase"; visual descriptions are prominent in all his writing, and sight and the gaze are also major motifs in all his works.

Publication history
1973, France, Éditions Fata Morgana, Saint-Clément-la-Rivière,(éd. définitive, 1993)
"Mydriase" was first published in 1973.There is also a preface by M.G. Le Clézio."Mydriase" was first published by Éditions Fata Morgana, Saint-Clément-la-Rivière, and re-published in an "éd. définitive" in  1993 by the same publishers.  (62 pages) 6 illustrations by Vladimir Velickovic.Reprinted as "Mydriase éd. définitive" (1993).

References

1973 essays
Essays by J. M. G. Le Clézio
Works by J. M. G. Le Clézio